Students For Liberty (SFL) is an international libertarian non-profit organization with origins in the United States. Formed in 2008, SFL grew to a network of 1,000 student organizations worldwide by 2014. 

It hosts an annual international conference and various regional conferences. Wolf von Laer became the chief executive officer in 2016.

History

Origin
Students in an Institute for Humane Studies Koch Summer Fellowship met on July 24, 2007, to discuss challenges faced by classical liberal student organizations. In 2008, Alexander McCobin and Sloane Frost organized a conference for 40 students involved in libertarian student groups. The first Students For Liberty conference was held at Columbia University from February 22 to 24, 2008, with 100 student participants. Afterward they formed Students For Liberty to provide continuing support to student groups. 

The group's stated mission is "to educate, develop, and empower the next generation of leaders of liberty." Le Monde and The Investigative Desk described SFL as "a key organisation in the Koch system" of groups. SFL is a partner in the Atlas Network.

In the news
SFL co-founder and former president Alexander McCobin opened his remarks on the February 19, 2010 panel "2 Minute Activist: Saving Freedom Across America" at the Conservative Political Action Conference (CPAC) by thanking the American Conservative Union for welcoming GOProud as a co-sponsor of the event. Ryan Sorba, California Young Americans for Freedom's chairman and author of The "Born Gay" Hoax, followed with harsh words for McCobin, SFL, Young Americans for Liberty's Jeff Frazee, and the American Conservative Union. The failed attempt of right-wing extremist Richard Spencer to speak at the annual Students For Liberty conference in Washington, D.C., in 2017 caused wider media attention. As a reaction to the violence in Charlottesville SFL's CEO Wolf von Laer issued a statement condemning right- and left-wing extremism and warning of political polarization on the fringes of society as a global threat.

Internationally, Students For Liberty has been noted by outlets such as Le Figaro, Die Welt, The Guardian, Le Soir, City A.M., 20Minutos, CNN, and Huffington Post Canada. SFL trained members of the Free Brazil Movement, which opposed then-president Dilma Rousseff. A spinoff of SFL, the Consumer Choice Center, was noted for its pro-vaping advocacy through the World Vapers' Alliance.

Programs

Conferences
SFL hosts an annual International Students For Liberty Conference (ISFLC). The inaugural ISFLC in 2008 brought 100 students from 42 schools in three countries to New York City. The second ISFLC in 2009 brought 153 students from 13 countries to George Washington University. The third ISFLC took place February 13–14, 2010 at American University in Washington, D.C., and had more than 300 students in attendance. The fourth ISFLC, covered by ReasonTV, returned to George Washington University on Friday, February 18–20, 2011, this time with 500 students participating. This international conference included a taping of Stossel, which aired March 31, in which John Stossel and Cato Institute Vice President David Boaz spoke. The 2012 ISFLC brought out 1,013 students. The following year, the conference attracted 1,406 attendees.

During the fall semester, SFL hosts regional conferences on campuses across the world. On November 18 to 20, 2011, SFL hosted the first European conference at the Katholieke Universiteit Leuven in Leuven, Belgium with over 200 students from 25 different countries attending. In 2013–2014, SFL hosted over 30 regional conferences in North America, Brazil, the Spanish-speaking Americas, and in Africa with over 5,000 student attendees. In the fiscal year 2017 Students For Liberty reported that its conferences were in total attended by over 19,800 students.

Free books
SFL, in conjunction with the Atlas Network, publishes a new book each year for classical liberal student groups. Previous books include The Economics of Freedom: What Your Professor Won't Tell You, The Morality of Capitalism: What Your Professors Won't Tell You, After the Welfare State, and Why Liberty. SFL's current book publication is Peace, Love, & Liberty and includes essays from writers such as Steven Pinker, Radley Balko, and Tom G. Palmer.

Virtual Speakers Bureau
SFL's Virtual Speakers Bureau allows student groups to choose from over 30 speakers to host at one of their campus meetings through Skype, Google Hangouts, or GoToMeeting. Some of the speakers include Andrew Bernstein, Greg Lukianoff, Jim Lark, Jeffrey Tucker, Lawrence Reed, Michael Huemer, Michael Strong, Tom G. Palmer, and Steven Horwitz.

Webinars
SFL hosts seminars using web conferencing. Held weekly during the academic year since 2009, the topics tend to focus on career advice, economics, history, law, leadership, philosophy, public policy, public speaking, and statistics. Past guest speakers include Jeffrey Miron of Harvard University, Bob Ewing of the Institute for Justice, John Hasnas of Georgetown University, Lawrence Reed of the Foundation for Economic Education, Jim Lark of the University of Virginia, Radley Balko of The Huffington Post, David Friedman of Santa Clara University, LGBT activist Zach Wahls, Tyler Cowen, Bryan Caplan, Peter Boettke, and Chris Coyne of George Mason University.

Campus Coordinator program
Campus Coordinators work with campus group leaders within a designated regional area to form and support student groups and to evaluate the efficiency and effectiveness of programs. The  school year saw the inaugural year of the program. Training is provided by the full-time staff as well as executive board members. The  class of coordinators included 60 students from the United States, Canada and Venezuela. The 2013–2014 campus coordinator class included 120 students from across the continent. This number grew to over 2,000 worldwide in the 2017–2018 class.

Alumni for Liberty

Alumni For Liberty is a network of working professionals interested in supporting students and student organizations dedicated to libertarianism. The program is open to all adults interested in supporting the student movement, whether or not they were a member of a liberty oriented student group. The project provides ways to remain involved in supporting the student movement for liberty with monthly updates describing opportunities such as networking events, job openings, training sessions, leadership dinners, options for financial support of alma mater student groups, speaking to student groups, and mentoring of students interested in related careers. Some notable alumni are the Brazilian political activist Kim Kataguiri, US political pundit Robby Soave, Global Alliance for Cannabis Commerce executive director and co-founder Randal John Meyer, economics professor Liya Palagashvili, education disruptor Zachary Slayback, North Korean activist Yeon-mi Park, Wolf3D co-founder Haver Järveoja, African Liberty managing director Olumayowa Okediran, the Danish politician Rasmus Brygger, Conscious Capitalism Inc. CEO Alexander McCobin, and the Swedish columnist and politician Alexandra Ivanov.

Young Voices
Young Voices was launched in 2013 and transitioned into its own standalone 501(c)(3) led by Casey Given as executive director. Young Voices functions as a nonprofit public relations operation, promoting the viewpoints of libertarian writers who apply and are accepted into the program.

Organizational structure

SFL is a 501(c)(3) organization that supports student groups advocating classical liberalism. SFL is run by over 47 full-time professionals at its headquarters in Washington, DC. Direction of the organization comes from the executive director Wolf von Laer, the board of directors, and the International Executive Board.

A notable member of the board of directors is WholeFoods CEO John Mackey.

North America
Students For Liberty got its start in North America and has grown tremendously ever since. In the 2013–2014 school year, 2,721 students attended SFL's 18 fall North American regional conferences. 1,275 students attended the 6th annual International Students For Liberty Conference in Washington, D.C., on February 14–16, 2014. In the same year, SFL's North American network grew to over 913 student groups with 120 Campus Coordinators. The 2017 class includes 217 Campus Coordinators.

Europe
In 2011, SFL established an executive board to expand their programs into Europe. On November 18–20, 2011 SFL hosted the first European Students For Liberty Conference (ESFLC) at the Katholieke Universiteit Leuven in Leuven, Belgium. A second conference on the same location was held on March 8–10, 2013. In 2013, a total of 1,234 people attended 10 fall regional conferences across the continent. In March 2014, the third annual ESFLC was held in the German capital Berlin at the Humboldt University of Berlin, which attracted 560 attendees from 28 countries. The 19 regional conferences from September to November 2015 gathered in total 3155 participants.

As of March 2016, European Students For Liberty is governed by an executive board of 10 students and recent graduates, chaired by Stoyan Panchev.

In March 2016, European Students For Liberty held its annual conference at Charles University in Prague, Czech Republic for over 900 people with the theme "Students We Should Remember." Speakers included Lawrence Reed, Tom G. Palmer, Lutz Kleveman, Annie Machon, Richard Vedder, Callum Clarke and more.

Spanish speaking Americas
In the spring of 2013, SFL launched Estudiantes por la Libertad, the Regional Executive Board for the Spanish-speaking Americas. The first Estudiantes por la Libertad Conference was held in Santiago, Chile from October 25–27 for 100 attendees. As of 2014, the Local Coordinator program included 103 student leaders from around Latin America.

In Bolivia, Estudiantes por la Libertad Bolivia was founded by the "charter team" members Roberto Ortiz and Luis Sergio Calbimonte in Santa Cruz de la Sierra, Bolivia, starting with a group of 20 members in 2013 and reaching almost a thousand young activist in different events through the years including a co-organized event with the Literature Nobel Prize winner Mario Vargas Llosa. The starter group was built with students of the Private University (UPSA) of Santa Cruz and NUR University.

Africa
African Students For Liberty (ASFL) ran the first West African Regional Conference on July 26–27, 2013 at the University of Ibadan, Nigeria and brought out 352 participants—SFL's largest ever first-time conference. ASFL organized the first East African Regional Conference in Nairobi, Kenya on May 9–10, 2014 and launched a Local Coordinator program the same year. The first African Students For Liberty Conference brought out 1180 students from all over Africa. In 2018, SFL acquired African Liberty, a platform that promotes individual and economic freedom in Africa, from Atlas Network. The platform is managed and edited by Ibrahim B. Anoba.

South Asia
South Asia Students For Liberty became an official SFL Regional Executive Board in 2014 with 20 Local Coordinators.

Asia-Pacific
Asia-Pacific Students For Liberty was launched in 2016 and is currently accepting applications for Local Coordinators.

Brazil 
Students For Liberty became an official SFL Regional Executive Board with 1037 Local Coordinators.

Finance
Incorporated as a 501(c)(3) non-profit organization, SFL accepts only private donations from individuals, foundations, and participation fees. During its first year, SFL raised fifty thousand dollars in revenue. The organization's revenue grew, realizing almost a quarter of a million dollars in the second year, then over one-half million dollars in the third year.  Expenses ran 65% of revenue in the first year, 75% of revenue in the second year, and 80% of revenue in the third year. In its sixth year, SFL's expenses increased from $1.4 million to $2.6 million and revenue increased from $1.9 million to $2.9 million. About 65% of its budget is spent on North American programs. 

The organization has received financial support from billionaires David H. Koch and Charles G. Koch and related groups such as the Cato Institute. According to Le Monde and The Investigative Desk, Students for Liberty has not formally disclosed its funders since 2016.

See also
 Liberal Flemish Students' Union

References

External links

 Students For Liberty's site
 Students For Liberty's conference site
 Organizational Profile – National Center for Charitable Statistics (Urban Institute)

Civil liberties advocacy groups
Classical liberalism
International student organizations
Libertarian organizations based in the United States
Tea Party movement
Youth rights organizations
Political organizations established in 2008
Student political organizations in the United States